Night Watch (also known as Detonator II: Night Watch) is a 1995 American television spy film directed by David Jackson starring Pierce Brosnan and Alexandra Paul. The film, also known as Alistair MacLean's Nightwatch, was shot in Hong Kong. The film aired on the USA Network. It is a sequel to Death Train.

Plot summary

Cast
 Pierce Brosnan as Michael 'Mike' Graham
 Alexandra Paul as Sabrina Carver
 William Devane as Nick Caldwell
 Michael J. Shannon as Martin Schraeder
 Lim Kay Siu as Mao Yixin (as Lim Kay Siu)
 Irene Ng as Myra Tang
 Hidde Maas as Miles Van Dehn
 Tom Jansen as Insp. De Jongh
 Tomislav Ralis as Louis Armand
 Harold Bone as Lemmer
 Rolf Saxon as Fisk
 Natalie Roles as Jennifer
 Kate Harper as Psychologist
 Mark King as Luke Sheehan
 Terry Diab as U.N.A.C.O. Voice (voice)
 Ron Berglas as Roger Flint
 Suncana Zelenika as Stephanie
 Ron Li-Paz as New York Broker 
 Jasna Bilušić as Amsterdam G.N.N. Reporter
 Neo Swee Lin as Croupier (as Swee-Lin)
 Goran Višnjić as  UN security officer
 Rex Wei as Korean Ship Captain
 Adrian Pang as Korean Technician
 Ed Miller as Hong Kong C.I.A. Technician

Novel
Like Death Train, the film was based on a novel by Alistair MacNeill which in turn was based on a story by Alistair MacLean.

MacLean had written a number of unfinished storylines before he died in 1987. These were fleshed out in novel form by Alistair MacNeill. Night Watch came out in 1990. A review of the novel said: "The book doesn't have MacLean's touch, but MacNeill has managed to capture some of the verve and daring spirit of the original. Like other recent remakes - including Ian Fleming and Rex Stout - this version of Alistair MacLean will probably fan the fires of loyalty among his fans". In 1991 a Warwickshire Council trading standards department sued the publisher of the novel claiming misleading advertising. In September the publishers were fined £6,250 for misleading advertising. By that stage they had sold 355,000 copies of MacNeill's novels.

When a third MacNeill novel, Time of the Assassins, came out in late 1991 the cover art was amended so MacNeill's name was as large as MacLean's.

Production
The film was shot in Zagreb, with some second unit filming involving Brosnan in Hong Kong. It was the last film Brosnan made before he played James Bond in Goldeneye.

Producer Neil MacDonald said the budget "will cost less to make altogether than Pierce's fee for appearing as James Bond in his next film".

Release
Night Watch aired on the USA Network on October 13, 1995. In the Philippines, the film was theatrically released by Globe Vision as The Destroyer in mid-1997.

DVD release
Detonator II: Night Watch is available on Region 1 DVD both individually and bundled as a double pack with Detonator (a.k.a. Death Train).

References

External links
 

1995 television films
1995 films
1995 action thriller films
1990s spy films
Action television films
British television films
Films based on British novels
Films based on works by Alistair MacLean
Films shot in Croatia
Hong Kong television films
Spy television films
American thriller television films
USA Network original films
Films directed by David Jackson (director)
1990s English-language films
1990s American films